Westport GAA is a Gaelic Athletic Association club located in Westport, County Mayo, Ireland. The club fields teams in both Gaelic football and hurling.

Achievements
 Mayo Senior Football Championship Winners 2022 Runners-Up 1905, 1907, 1912, 1927, 1929, 1937, 1942, 1991
All-Ireland Intermediate Club Football Championship Winners 2017
 Mayo Senior Hurling Championship Winners 1962, 1964, 1969, 1970
 Connacht Intermediate Club Football Championship Winners 2016
 Mayo Intermediate Football Championship Winners 2009, 2016
 Mayo Junior Football Championship Winners 1937, 1941, 1970
 Mayo Under 21 Football Championship Winners 2017
 Mayo Minor Football Championship Winners 2018
 Mayo Junior B Football Championship Winners 2018
 Mayo Intermediate Ladies Football Championship Winners 2018

Notable players
Kevin Keane
Lee Keegan

References

External links
 Westportgaa.com

Gaelic games clubs in County Mayo